Rosa Alice Branco (born 1950 Aveiro) is a Portuguese poet.  She is Secretary to the Portuguese PEN Club,

In December 2016, her work Cattle of the Lord was selected as one of the "Top 10 New Books to Read in December" by the highly regarded The Chicago Review of Books. This book translated by Alexis Levitin.

Works in English 
Cattle of the lord : poems, Minneapolis: Milkweed Editions, 2016. ,

Works 
 Animais da Terra, Limiar (1988)
 O Desenvolvimento da Filosofia do Sugerir: a Percepção como Operação Interpretativa, tese de mestrado (1990)
 Monadologia Breve, Limiar (1991)
 O Que falta ao Mundo para ser Quadro, Limiar (1993)
 A Mão Feliz. Poemas D(e)ícticos, Limiar (1994)
 O Único Traço de Pincel, Limiar (1997)
 Da Alma e dos Espíritos Animais, Campo das Letras (2001)
 Soletrar o Dia, Quasi Edições (2002)
 Animal Volátil, Edições Afrontamento (2005) - juntamente com Casimiro de Brito
 O Mundo Não Acaba no Frio dos Teus Ossos, Quasi Edições (2009)
 Gado do Senhor, & Etc. (2011)
 Gado e o Gado, & Gado (2018)

References

External links 
 - Infopédia
 
 

1950 births
Living people
People from Aveiro, Portugal
Portuguese women poets
20th-century Portuguese poets
21st-century Portuguese poets
21st-century Portuguese women writers
20th-century Portuguese women writers